Vélez de Benaudalla is a municipality in the province of Granada, Spain. According to the 2008 census (INE), the city has a population of 2,980 inhabitants.

The Spanish national highway Autovía A-44,  European route E 902, has its southern terminus here. Originally a farming area during the 16th century, it is now populated with scattered structures that are used for sporadic stays on weekends or holidays.

References

Municipalities in the Province of Granada